The 22d Air Refueling Wing is a United States Air Force unit assigned to the Air Mobility Command's Eighteenth Air Force. It is stationed at McConnell Air Force Base, Kansas and also functions as the host wing for McConnell.

Its primary mission is to provide global reach by conducting air refueling and airlift where and when needed. It is one of only three "supertanker" wings in the Air Force, with four Regular Air Force air refueling squadrons, and 47 Boeing KC-135R Stratotanker and Boeing KC-46 Pegasus aircraft.

Its origins date to 1940 as the 22d Bombardment Group.  The group was one of the first United States Army Air Forces units to be deployed into the Pacific Theater after the Pearl Harbor Attack with the Martin B-26 Marauder medium bomber.  The 22d Operations Group carries the lineage and history of its highly decorated World War II predecessor unit.  Active for over 60 years, the 22 Air Refueling Wing and its earlier designation as the 22d Bombardment Wing, was a component wing of Strategic Air Command's deterrent force during the Cold War.

The 22d Air Refueling Wing is commanded by Colonel Richard Tanner. Its Vice Commander is Colonel Mark Baran. The Wing's Command Chief Master Sergeant is Chief Master Sergeant Melissa Royster.

History
 For additional history and lineage, see 22d Operations Group
Established as 22d Bombardment Wing, Medium, on 28 July 1948. Activated on 1 August 1948.  The new wing was assigned to March Air Force Base, California on 10 May 1949.  It was not operational, so it shared a commander with the 1st Fighter Wing.  The 22d Bomb became operational on 1 July 1949.  The 1st Fighter Wing was attached to it and both wings shared the same commanding officer.

Korean War
Detached from the wing, the 22d Bombardment Group deployed its B-29s in early July 1950 to Kadena Air Base, Okinawa, where it came under control of Far Ease Air Forces Bomber Command (Provisional).  On 13 July, the group flew its first mission, against the marshaling yards and oil refinery at Wonsan, North Korea. By 21 October, it had amassed fifty-seven missions against the enemy, attacking bridges, factories, industrial targets, troop concentrations, airfields, marshalling yards, communications centers, and port facilities. During four months of combat, the group flew 335 sorties with only fourteen aborts and dropped over 6,500 tons of bombs. It redeployed to the United States in late October and November 1950.

Cold War
 
Following the return of the Bombardment Group the wing re-equipped the propeller-driven B-29s with new B-47E Stratojet swept-wing bomber medium bombers in 1953, capable of flying at high subsonic speeds and primarily designed for penetrating the airspace of the Soviet Union. It trained for proficiency in global strategic bombardment, adding air refueling to its mission in 1952. The wing deployed at RAF Mildenhall, England, September–December 1951, and at RAF Upper Heyford, England, December 1953 – March 1954.  From April to July 1957, it deployed to Andersen Air Force Base, Guam. SAC began phasing the B-47 out of the inventory beginning in 1962, sending the last of the wing's aircraft to Davis-Monthan Air Force Base, Arizona in 1963.

The wing was not tactically operational 11 March 1963 – 15 September 1963, while converting to B-52D bombers and KC-135A tankers.  The wing supported Fifteenth Air Force's post-attack command and control system with EC-135s from, September 1964 – March 1970.

The 22d was a "super" wing from 1966–1971, with two bombardment and two tanker squadrons.  From 10 March to c. 1 October 1967 the wing was reduced to a small "rear-echelon" non-tactical organization with all tactical resources and most support resources loaned to SAC organizations involved in combat operations in Southeast Asia.  In 1971 the Air Force retired all of its B-52C aircraft.  The last airplane of this series was flown from March to Davis-Monthan Air Force Base, Arizona for storage on 29 September 1971. The wing continued to support SAC operations in the Far East and Southeast Asia through 1975, and from 10 April 1972 to 29 October 1973 again the wing had all its bomber resources loaned to other organizations for combat and contingency operations.  The wing's KC-135 resources were also on loan from 10 April to September 1972; afterwards, a few tankers returned to wing control.

The wing maintained a strategic bombardment alert posture from, 1973–1982, but in 1978 it added conventional warfare missions, including mine-laying and sea reconnaissance/surveillance.  For many years, the wing provided the operations staff and support of the Tanker Task Force (TTF) operations supporting Red Flag exercise flight operations on the Nellis Ranges, north of Las Vegas, NV, using KC-135 personnel and equipment assets deploying from other bases for the duration of a Red Flag Exercise.  The tanker task force staff TTF at March also supported overseas deployments of U.S. Navy, Marine Corps and USAF fighter aircraft going to the Pacific Region using both KC-135 and KC-10 tankers.

In 1982, the wing retired its B-52D aircraft and converted from a bombardment wing (BMW) to an air refueling wing (ARW).  It was the first USAF unit to operate the new KC-10A along with KC-135A and KC-135E aircraft.  From 1982, the wing provided strategic air refueling and airlift in support of worldwide U.S. Air Force and other Department of Defense operations and training exercises.  In 1983, the wing moved personnel and cargo in support of Chadian resistance to Libyan incursions and conducted airlift and refueling missions during rescue of U.S. nationals in Grenada.  The wing also provided specialized refueling support to SR-71 aircraft reconnaissance operations using Boeing KC-135Q and (after the CFM-56 conversion) KC-135T aircraft with specialized fuel systems designed to handle the JP-7 fuel, worldwide from 1985 to 1990.

In 1989, the 22 ARW transferred its KC-135E and KC-135Q aircraft and became solely a KC-10 unit.

After the Cold War 

The 22 ARW supported F-117 deployments to Saudi Arabia and contributed aircraft and personnel to logistics efforts in support of the liberation of Kuwait from, 1990–1991.

On 1 June 1992, Strategic Air Command was inactivated and the 22d ARW was assigned to the newly established Air Mobility Command (AMC).  From the end of 1992 to 1994, the wing flew humanitarian airlift missions to Somalia and it also provided air refueling in support of deployments to Haiti in 1994.

On 1 January 1994, the wing was reassigned without personnel or equipment from March upon the transfer of March to the Air Force Reserve Command) to McConnell Air Force Base, Kansas, replacing the inactivating 384th Bomb Wing and assuming control of the 384th's KC-135R aircraft.  The 22 ARW's former KC-10A aircraft assets were subsequently transferred to the 60th Airlift Wing at Travis Air Force Base, California, that unit being redesignated as the 60th Air Mobility Wing (60 AMW).

Various air refueling squadrons were reassigned to the reconstituted 22 ARW from other units as follows:

 344 ARS from 68 ARW, Seymour Johnson Air Force Base, North Carolina
 349 & 350 ARS from 100 ARW, Beale Air Force Base, California
 384 ARS from inactivated 384 BW, McConnell Air Force Base, Kansas

After the realignment, the 22 ARW deployed crews and aircraft to support no-fly missions over northern and southern Iraq and over Bosnia and Herzegovina.  In 1999, wing aircraft and crews deployed to the Mediterranean to refuel NATO aircraft over Serbia.  After the terrorist attacks on 11 September 2001, wing-supplied tanker crews and aircraft air-refueled combat aircraft on missions to the Afghanistan area.

The wing provided deployed KC-135R support during Operation Iraqi Freedom and continues to provide aerial refueling and air mobility support under Operation Noble Eagle in the United States, Operation Enduring Freedom and Operation New Dawn overseas, and other AMC, USTRANSCOM, other combatant command, and associated national taskings as required.

On 25 January 2019, the Wing received the first two (15-46009 and 17-46031) of a planned 36 KC-46 Pegasus aircraft that will eventually replace the KC-135 as the primary Air Force tanker aircraft. A further two (17-46030 and 16-46022) were delivered to McConnell on 31 January.

Subordinate organizations 
22d Operations Group (22 OG)
344th Air Refueling Squadron (344 ARS) (Black tail stripe, now white)
349th Air Refueling Squadron (349 ARS) (Blue tail stripe, now white)
350th Air Refueling Squadron (350 ARS) (Yellow tail stripe, now white)
22d Operations Support Squadron (22 OSS)

22d Maintenance Group (22 MXG)
22d Maintenance Squadron (22 MXS)
22d Aircraft Maintenance Squadron (22 AMXS)
22d Maintenance Operations Squadron (22 MOS)

22d Mission Support Group (22 MSG)
22d Security Forces Squadron (22 SFS)
 22d Contracting Squadron (22 CONS)
22d Force Support Squadron (22 FSS)
22d Logistics Readiness Squadron (22 LRS)
22d Communications Squadron (22 CS)
22d Civil Engineering Squadron (22 CES)

22d Medical Group (22 MDG)
22d Medical Operations Squadron (22 MDOS)
22d Aeromedical Dental Squadron (22 AMDS)
22d Medical Support Squadron (22 MDSS)
Additionally, the 22d Comptroller Squadron (22 CPTS) reports directly to the wing staff.

Lineage
 Constituted as the 22d Bombardment Wing, Medium on 28 July 1948
 Activated on 1 August 1948
 Redesignated: 22d Bombardment Wing, Heavy on 15 March 1963
 Redesignated: 22d Air Refueling Wing, Heavy on 1 October 1982
 Redesignated: 22d Air Refueling Wing on 1 September 1991

Assignments

 Fifteenth Air Force, 1 August 1948
 Attached to: 301st Bombardment Wing, 1 August 1948 – 9 May 1949
 Attached to: 1st Fighter Wing, 10 May – 30 June 1949
 12th Air Division, 10 February 1951
 Attached to: 7th Air Division, 5 September – 4 December 1951; 7 December 1953 – 5 March 1954
 Attached to: 3d Air Division, 1 April – 5 July 1957
 47th Air (later, 47th Strategic Aerospace; 47th Air) Division, 1 January 1962

 14th Strategic Aerospace Division, 31 March 1970
 47th Air Division, 30 June 1971
 12th Strategic Missile (later, 12th Air) Division, 1 August 1972
 47th Air Division, 1 October 1985
 14th Air Division, 23 January 1987
 Fifteenth Air Force, 1 July 1988
 Eighteenth Air Force, since 1 October 2003

Components
Wings
 1st Fighter Wing: attached 1 July 1949 – 1 April 1950
 330th Bombardment Wing: attached 27 June 1949 – 30 April 1951

Groups
 22d Bombardment (later, 22d Operations) Group: 1 August 1948 – 16 June 1952 (detached 1 August 1948 – 30 June 1949; 14 November 1949 – 20 February 1950; 4 July – c. 31 October 1950); 1 September 1991 – .
 458th Operations Group: 1 June 1992 – 1 July 1995

Squadrons
 2d Bombardment Squadron: attached 10 February 1951 – 15 June 1952, assigned 16 June 1952 – 15 March 1963; 15 September 1963 – 1 October 1982
 6th Air Refueling Squadron: 3 January 1989 – 1 September 1991
 9th Air Refueling Squadron: 1 August 1982 – 1 September 1991
 408th Bombardment Squadron: 1 January 1959 – 1 January 1962
 19th Bombardment Squadron: attached 10 February 1951 – 15 June 1952, assigned 16 June 1952 – 15 March 1963
 22d Air Refueling Squadron: attached 10 February 1951 – 15 June 1952, assigned 16 June 1952 – 15 June 1960; 1 July 1963 – 1 December 1989
 33d Bombardment Squadron: attached 10 February 1951 – 15 June 1952, assigned 16 June 1952 – 15 March 1963
 320th Air Refueling Squadron: 16 June 1960 – 15 September 1962
 352d Bombardment Squadron: attached 20 September – c. November 1951
 486th Bombardment Squadron: 2 October 1966 – 1 July 1971
 909th Air Refueling Squadron: 25 June 1966 – 1 July 1971

Stations
 Smoky Hill Air Force Base, Kansas, 1 August 1948
 March Air Force Base, California, 1 May 1949 – 31 December 1993
 McConnell Air Force Base, Kansas, 1 January 1994 – present

Aircraft operated

F-86 Sabre (1949–1950)
KC-97 Stratofreighter (1952–1962)
B-47 Stratojet (1953–1963)
B-52 Stratofortress (1963–1982)
EC-135 Bird of Prey (1963–1970)

KC-135 Stratotanker (1963–1989; 1994–present)
KC-10 Extender (1982–1994)
C-21 (1992–1993)
C-12 Huron (1993–1995)
KC-46 Pegasus (2019–present)

References for commands and major units assigned, components and stations:

Operations
Korean War
Operation Urgent Fury
Operation Northern Watch
Operation Southern Watch
Operation Deliberate Force
Operation Allied Force
Operation Enduring Freedom
Operation Iraqi Freedom

See also
 List of B-29 units of the United States Air Force
 List of B-47 units of the United States Air Force
 List of B-52 Units of the United States Air Force

References

Notes

Bibliography

 This article contains information from the 22d Air Refueling Wing history factsheet which is an official document of the United States Government and is presumed to be in the public domain.

External links

  Air Force Historical Research Agency
 Heritage and Legacy: A Brief History of the 22d Air Refueling Wing and McConnell Air Force Base
McConnell AFB Home Page

Military units and formations established in 1948
Units and formations of Strategic Air Command
0022
Military units and formations in Kansas